Third Day is the reissue of the debut studio album from the Christian rock band of the same name. It marks the third release of the material: first as the 1994  self-funded, Contagious, then the 1995 self-titled Gray Dot version, and this 1996 release after the band signed with Reunion Records.

Reception
Third Day was well received by both critics and audience. As of 2000, it has been certified gold.

Accolades
 "Consuming Fire" - Billboard Music Award for Best Christian video.
 "Consuming Fire" Winner of 2011 WMIFF Best Gospel Music video

Other releases 
The band released a self-titled album in 1995 through the independent label, Gray Dot Records. It was an early version of this album. The album sold 20,000 copies.

In 2016 a 20th anniversary limited edition vinyl album was made available.

Track listing
All tracks written by Mac Powell, except where noted.

Personnel

Third Day
 Mac Powell – acoustic guitar, lead and backing vocals
 Brad Avery – lead guitar, additional backing vocals
 Mark Lee – acoustic guitar, electric guitar
 Tai Anderson – bass guitar, additional backing vocals
 David Carr – drums, percussion

Additional musicians
 Bob Lehman – acoustic guitar on "Love Song" and "Take My Life"
 Kenny Hutson – dobro, mandolin
 David Mardis – lap steel guitar
 Rich Mullins – hammered dulcimer
 Matt Still – Hammond B3 organ on "Praise Song"
 Alexis Mears – strings
 Chad Merritt – strings
 Kristie Vanderpoel – strings
 Chris Carder – additional backing vocals
 Alfreda Gerald – additional backing vocals
 Phil Jones – additional backing vocals
 Choir on "Thief" – Jill Bullard, Chris Carder, David Carr, Melissa Chandler, Jennifer DeSilets, Jane Jones, Kristine McGuire, Dina Vanderpoel and Steve Winkler

Production
 David Mardis – producer
 Chris Smith – A&R
 Ed Burdell – engineer, mixing
 David Mardis – engineer, mixing
 Matt Still – engineer, mixing
 Ty Shelton – assistant engineer
 Paul Thompson – assistant engineer
 Furies Studio, Marietta, Georgia – recording location
 Bosstown Recording Studio, Atlanta, Georgia – recording location
 Ken Love – mastering at MasterMix, Nashville, Tennessee
 Diana Lussenden – art direction, design
 Ben Pearson – photography

Charts

References 

1996 debut albums
Third Day albums
Reunion Records albums